Institute of Hotel Management Catering Technology & Applied Nutrition, Bathinda is a hospitality college located in Bathinda, Punjab, India. Also known as IHM Bathinda or IHMCT Bathinda, the institute was started by the joint efforts of the Indian Ministry of Tourism and the Punjab Department of Tourism. Founded in 2009, the institute is affiliated with the National Council for Hotel Management.

Courses offered 
The institute offers the following courses:

External links 

 Official Website

References 

Universities and colleges in Punjab, India
Hospitality schools in India